Hyloxalus alessandroi is a species of frog in the family Dendrobatidae.
It is endemic to Peru where it is known from the Cusco and Puno Regions.
Its natural habitats are tropical moist montane forest and rivers.
It is threatened by habitat loss.

References

alessandroi
Amphibians of Peru
Endemic fauna of Peru
Taxonomy articles created by Polbot
Amphibians described in 2001